The Pacific Islands Forum (PIF) is an inter-governmental organization that aims to enhance cooperation between countries and territories of Oceania, including formation of a trade bloc and regional peacekeeping operations. It was founded in 1971 as the South Pacific Forum (SPF), and changed its name in 1999 to "Pacific Islands Forum", so as to be more inclusive of the Forum's Oceania-spanning membership of both north and south Pacific island countries, including Australia. It is a United Nations General Assembly observer.

The mission of the Pacific Islands Forum is "to work in support of Forum member governments, to enhance the economic and social well-being of the people of the South Pacific by fostering cooperation between governments and between international agencies, and by representing the interests of Forum members in ways agreed by the Forum". Its decisions are implemented by the Pacific Islands Forum Secretariat (PIFS), which grew out of the South Pacific Bureau for Economic Co-operation (SPEC). As well as its role in harmonising regional positions on various political and policy issues, the Forum Secretariat has technical programmes in economic development, transport and trade. The Pacific Islands Forum Secretary General is the permanent Chairman of the Council of Regional Organisations in the Pacific (CROP).

Australia and New Zealand are generally larger and wealthier than the other countries that make up the rest of the Forum, with Australia's population being around twice that of the other members combined and its economy being more than five times larger. They are significant aid donors and big markets for exports from the other island countries. Military and police forces as well as civilian personnel of Forum states, chiefly Australia and New Zealand, have recently been part of regional peacekeeping and stabilization operations in other states, notably in Solomon Islands (2003–) and Nauru (2004–2009), under Forum auspices. Such regional efforts are mandated by the Biketawa Declaration, which was adopted at the 31st Summit of Pacific Islands Forum Leaders, held at Kiribati in October 2000. The 50th meeting of the Forum took place in Tuvalu in August 2019. In February 2021, Palau announced that it would be leaving the Pacific Island Forum after a dispute regarding Henry Puna's election as the Forum's secretary-general. The Federated States of Micronesia, Kiribati, the Marshall Islands, and Nauru also decided to leave the Forum after Palau's decision. In February 2022 it was announced that the departure process had been paused, pending proposed reforms. However, on 9 July 2022 Kiribati confirmed its withdrawal. On 30 January 2023, Prime Minister of Fiji Sitiveni Rabuka confirmed that Kiribati has reconciled with the Pacific Islands Forum and plans to rejoin soon. Rabuka met Kiribati president Taneti Mamau who informed Rabuka of the decision.

The larger Pacific Community functions mainly to promote international development by providing technical and scientific advice and funding development projects, and does not consider security issues or function as a trade bloc.

History 

The Forum grew out of a proposal from Cook Islander Premier Albert Henry for a political forum to work alongside the existing South Pacific Commission. The idea was supported by other newly-independent island nations, and they agreed to meet to discuss a permanent body. The first meeting of the South Pacific Forum was initiated by New Zealand and held in Wellington, New Zealand, from 5–7 August 1971 with attendants of the following seven countries: the President of Nauru, the Prime Ministers of Western Samoa, Tonga and Fiji, the Premier of the Cook Islands, the Australian Minister for External Territories, and the Prime Minister of New Zealand. It was a private and informal discussion of a wide range of issues of common concern, concentrating on matters directly affecting the daily lives of the people of the islands of the South Pacific, devoting particular attention to trade, shipping, tourism, and education. Afterwards this meeting was held annually in member countries and areas in turn. In 1999, the 30th South Pacific Forum decided to be renamed the organization to the Pacific Islands Forum, to better account for areas outside the south Pacific. Immediately after the forum's annual meeting at head of government level, the Post Forum Dialogue (PFD) is conducted at ministerial level with PFD development partners around the world.

Suspension of Fiji 
In August 2008, the Forum threatened to suspend Fiji if the latter did not commit to holding a general election by March 2009. Subsequently, at a special leaders' meeting of the Pacific Islands Forum held in Papua New Guinea in January 2009, Forum leaders set a deadline of 1 May, by which date Fiji must set a date for elections before the end of the year. Fiji rejected the deadline. Consequently, on 2 May, Fiji was suspended indefinitely from participation in the Forum with immediate effect. Toke Talagi, the Chair of the Pacific Islands Forum and Premier of Niue, described the suspension as "also particularly timely given the recent disturbing deterioration of the political, legal and human rights situation in Fiji since April 10, 2009". He described Fiji as “a regime which displays such a total disregard for basic human rights, democracy and freedom” which he believed contravened membership of the Pacific Islands Forum. Talagi emphasised, however, that Fiji had not been expelled and that it would be welcomed back into the fold when it returned to the path of "constitutional democracy, through free and fair elections".

The 2009 suspension of Fiji marked the first time that a country had been suspended from the Pacific Islands Forum in the history of the then 38-year-old organization.

Following the Fijian general election of 17 September 2014, the Forum lifted the suspension of Fiji on 22 October 2014.

Micronesian withdrawal
Following the election of Henry Puna as Secretary-General in February 2021 during a virtual meeting, Palau threatened to leave the Forum, claiming that a "gentlemen's agreement" to rotate the position between Melanesia, Micronesia, and Polynesia, had been violated. Puna had won a ballot by one vote (9–8) against the Marshall Island's Gerald Zackios, who was supported by five nations from Micronesia. On 4 February, Palau formally terminated its participation in the forum, citing that the "process regarding the appointment of the Secretary General has clearly indicated to the Republic of Palau that unity, regionalism and the Pacific Way no longer guide the Forum", and closed its embassy in Fiji. On 6 February, the Forum's chair responded to the allegations, stating that there was a consensus decisions following an agreed process and that "we have upheld our principles and values as characterised through the Pacific way". On 8 February the Palau National Congress formally passed a joint resolution, supporting the decision made by President Surangel Whipps Jr. to leave the Forum. Whipps has stated Puna has to step down for Palau to rejoin the Forum.

After Palau's decision to leave the Forum, several other participant countries have indicated their intention to review their membership. In general, the countries of Micronesia, with smaller populations and economies, have complained of being sidelined by larger countries, including Australia, Fiji, New Zealand, and Papua New Guinea. There had only ever been one Micronesian Secretary-General of the PIF. The day after Palau's withdrawal, MPs in the Marshall Islands, who had previously supported Zackios, called for the government to review its participation in the Forum, but opposed withdrawal. The Federated States of Micronesia and Nauru have openly questioned whether they will remain members. Nauru President Lionel Aingimea has signaled his intention to pull out, stating that "If this is the way Micronesia is treated, then it is better off withdrawing from the Forum". Four members of the Micronesian bloc – the Federated States of Micronesia, Kiribati, the Marshall Islands, and Nauru – decided to hold a virtual meeting to discuss whether to exit the Forum. Australia has attempted to convince the four Pacific Island nations not to pull out. While it has indicated a desire to continue to work with the Micronesian group if it chose to pull out of the Forum, it emphasized the need for Pacific unity.

On 9 February 2021, the remaining Micronesian states – the Federated States of Micronesia, Kiribati, the Marshall Islands, and Nauru – decided to leave the Forum. Micronesian leaders released a statement to "collectively express their great disappointment with the Pacific Islands Forum Secretary General appointment process", with each state jointly agreeing to formally initiate the process of withdrawal from the Forum. Their departure reduces the Forum to 12 members, all of them in the South Pacific. It may take up to a year for the countries to formally leave the regional body. Australian Foreign Minister Marise Payne has stated that "we will continue to work very closely with the members of the Pacific Forum".

In February 2022, it was announced that the five Micronesian countries would pause the process of their departure. The President of the Federated States of Micronesia, David Panuelo, said that he had been told that Henry Puna would step down as Secretary-General, and that other reforms would occur. The Pacific Islands Forum secretariat did not officially confirm Puna's departure, saying only that talks were ongoing. President Whipps of Palau said that the pause gave the Forum one last chance to do the right thing. In April, it was reported that the President of the Marshall Islands, David Kabua, was urging other Micronesian leaders to agree to several proposed reforms but to withdraw their demand for Puna to step down. In June 2022, Forum leaders reached an agreement which would see Puna remain in office, and be replaced by a Micronesian candidate when his term ended. The rotation of the Secretary-General between Micronesia, Melanesia and Polynesia would be made a permanent feature of the Forum, and two deputy secretary-general positions would be created for the other sub-regions. Kiribati did not agree to the arrangement, and on 9 July 2022 withdrew from the Forum with immediate effect.

Membership 
In September 2011, the U.S. territories of American Samoa, Guam, and the Northern Mariana Islands were granted observer status in the Pacific Islands Forum, while in September 2016 the French territories of French Polynesia and New Caledonia were granted full membership. Easter Island (administered by Chile) and Hawaii (an oceanic state of the U.S.) have both considered gaining representation.  Kiribati withdrew from the Forum in 2022. The government of Kiribati changed its mind the next year in 2023 and decided to rejoin the form, making its plans clear by a meeting of President of Kiribati Taneti Mamau with  Prime Minister of Fiji Sitiveni Rabuka where Mamau told Rabuka about Kiribati's plan. Rabuka confirmed to the media that such a meeting did take place and stated that that Kiribati has reconciled with the Pacific Islands Forum and will rejoin the Fourm soon.

Statistics 

1 Associate member

Secretaries General 

The Secretary General of the Pacific Islands Forum Secretariat is appointed to a three-year term by the leaders of the member states. The Secretary General reports directly to the national leaders and the Forum Officials' Committee (FOC). The Secretary General also automatically serves as the permanent chairman of the Council of Regional Organisations in the Pacific (CROP).

Institutions and legal framework 

The Pacific Islands Forum Secretariat was established initially as a trade bureau in 1972 and later became the South Pacific Bureau for Economic Co-operation (SPEC). The name South Pacific Forum Secretariat was approved by member governments in 1988 and changed to Pacific Islands Forum Secretariat in 2000.

There are four divisions in the Pacific Islands Forum Secretariat, and each of these divisions has direct responsibility for a range of programs designed to improve the capacity of the Forum member countries and to co-ordinate action on matters of common interest:

 Development and Economic Policy
 Trade and Investment
 Political, International and Legal Affairs
 Corporate Services

The Forum Economic Ministers Meeting (FEMM) established in 1995, plays a key role in assessing regional economic developments.

Pacific Island Countries Trade Agreement 

The Pacific Island Countries Trade Agreement (PICTA) aims to establish a free-trade area between 14 of the Pacific Islands Forum countries. As of 2013, it had been signed by 12 states:

It has not been signed by either Palau or the Marshall Islands. All of the signing states have ratified the treaty, with the exception of Micronesia. As of March 2008, six countries had announced that domestic arrangements had been made enabling them to trade under the agreement: Cook Islands, Fiji, Niue, Samoa, Solomon Islands, Vanuatu.

After the trade agreement goes into force, countries commit to removing tariffs on most goods by 2021. As of April 2008, The Forum Island Countries are also negotiating an Economic Partnership Agreement (EPA) with the European Union. It is important to note that the PICTA discussed here covers only the trade of goods. At the Forum Island Leaders Meeting held in Rarotonga, Cook Islands on 28 August 2012, nine members signed the Pacific Island Countries Trade Agreement Trade in Services (PICTA TIS).  As of April 2008, there is an ongoing negotiation to design and agree on a protocol to include trade in services and the temporary movement of natural persons (a broader concept than the GATS's Mode 4).

The Office of the Chief Trade Adviser was established on 29 March 2010 to provide independent advice and support to the Pacific Forum Island Countries (FICs) in the PACER Plus trade negotiations with Australia and New Zealand.

Recent works 
An “open skies” policy has been under work by a number of nations. The Pacific Islands Air Services Agreement or PIASA would allow member nations to have more access for their airlines to other member countries. To date there have been ten signatories, Cook Islands, Kiribati, Nauru, Niue, Papua New Guinea, Samoa, Solomon Islands, Tonga, Tuvalu and Vanuatu. Six countries have ratified the agreement: Cook Islands, Nauru, Niue, Samoa, Tonga and Vanuatu.

At the 19–20 August 2008 Pacific Islands Forum meeting in Niue, the leaders discussed Pacific Plan priorities including, “fisheries, energy, trade and economic integration, climate change and transport, in addition to information and communication technology, health, education, and good governance.” Leaders also discussed the impacts of climate change and adopted the Niue Declaration on Climate Change. Restoration of democratic governance in Fiji was discussed as were consequences should the interim government fail to meet established deadlines. Regional assistance to the Solomon Islands and Nauru was discussed, followed by discussion of radioactive contamination in the Marshall Islands from US government tests. Regional institutional framework issues and WTO Doha round developments were discussed, followed by discussion of country-initiatives and the Pacific Region Infrastructure Facility launched 19 August 2008 to provide up to A$200 million over four years to help improve infrastructure in Kiribati, Samoa, Solomon Islands, Tonga, Tuvalu and Vanuatu. The United Nations announced that it would partner with Samoa to develop an Inter-Agency Climate Change Centre to help Pacific island nations combat the impacts of climate change in the region.
In the 2013 forum, the Marshall Islands, supported by all other Pacific nations, claimed compensation from the United States for the nuclear tests conducted on the islands during the 1940s and 1950s.

In the Nadi Bay declaration of 30 July 2019, the Pacific Islands Forum warned that coral atoll nations could be uninhabitable as early as 2030, expressed their deeply concern about a lack of "comprehension, ambition or commitment" from developed nations and called for an immediate reduction of greenhouse gas emissions.

On 27 January 2021, the European Union and the Pacific Island Forum Secretariat agreed a project worth EUR 5.75 million to enhance the trade capacity of Pacific Island countries. The project titled “Strengthening Pacific Intra-Regional and International Trade (SPIRIT)” is designed to boost and increase intra-regional and international trade by strengthening institutional and technical capacity in the Pacific Island region. It will also facilitate the implementation of other trade agreements, in particular the Economic Partnership Agreement (EPA) and of the Pacific's Aid-for-Trade Strategy 2020–2025.

See also 
 Forum Fisheries Agency
 Melanesian Spearhead Group
 Pacific Community
 Pacific Forum Line – a regional shipping company owned by 12 Pacific Islands Forum member countries
 Pacific Games
 Pacific Islands Private Sector Organisation (PIPSO)
 Pacific Trade Invest
 Pacific Union
 Polynesian Leaders Group
 Trade bloc

References

External links 

 
 "Backgrounder: Pacific Islands Forum", Xinhua, August 18, 2008
 Articles on Pacific Islands Agricultural Trade at Agritrade

 
International organizations based in Oceania
New Zealand–Pacific relations
Organisations based in Fiji
Organizations established in 1971
Politics of Oceania
United Nations General Assembly observers
1971 establishments in Oceania